North East Hertfordshire is a constituency represented in the House of Commons of the UK Parliament since 1997 by Oliver Heald, a Conservative.

Constituency profile 
The constituency includes the towns of Letchworth, Baldock and Royston and the undulating rural area, strewn with traditional English villages primarily to their south, most of which are within the more accessible parts of the London Commuter Belt and west of London Stansted Airport.

History
The constituency was created in for the 1997 general election largely from parts of the abolished County Constituency of North Hertfordshire, including Letchworth, Baldock and Royston.  It also included rural areas of the District of East Hertfordshire transferred from the constituencies of Hertford and Stortford and Stevenage.

Boundaries 

1997–2010: The District of North Hertfordshire wards of Arbury, Baldock, Grange, Letchworth East, Letchworth South East, Letchworth South West, Newsells, Royston East, Royston West, Sandon, Weston, and Wilbury, and the District of East Hertfordshire wards of Braughing, Buntingford, Cottered, Little Hadham, Munden, Standon St Mary, Stapleford, Tewin, Thundridge, and Watton-at-Stone.

2010–present: The District of North Hertfordshire wards of Arbury, Baldock East, Baldock Town, Ermine, Letchworth East, Letchworth Grange, Letchworth South East, Letchworth South West, Letchworth Wilbury, Royston Heath, Royston Meridian, Royston Palace, and Weston and Sandon, and the District of East Hertfordshire wards of Braughing, Buntingford, Hertford Rural North, Hertford Rural South, Little Hadham, Mundens and Cottered, Puckeridge, Thundridge and Standon, Walkern, and Watton-at-Stone.

Minor changes due to revision of local authority wards.

Members of Parliament

Elections

Elections in the 2010s

Elections in the 2000s

Elections in the 1990s

Note: Although a Conservative win due to the seat being newly created, the winning candidate was the previous MP for North Hertfordshire, which was abolished and largely reformed as North East Hertfordshire.

See also 
 List of parliamentary constituencies in Hertfordshire

Notes

References

Parliamentary constituencies in Hertfordshire
Constituencies of the Parliament of the United Kingdom established in 1997
Politics of East Hertfordshire District
Politics of North Hertfordshire District